Princess Jinyang, born Li Mingda; (633– 644) was a princess of the Tang Dynasty. She was considered as the only princess of China who was raised by an emperor.

Biography
Li Mingda was the nineteenth daughter of Emperor Taizong of Tang and the third daughter of Empress Zhangsun.

While Empress Zhangsun died on July 28, 636. Li Mingda did not know anything about her mother's death as a toddler. While she grew up after years, she knew the truth, and often felt sad about that. She and her brother Li Zhi were both raised by father Emperor Taizong. When Li Zhi was 14, Li Mingda felt sad about that because the siblings were grown up together, Li Zhi was a grown adult then, he needed to go to his manor, and she did not want to separate with him.

Li Mingda was good at calligraphy. Once she made a replica of her father's work, no one could distinguish which was by her and which is Taizong's original work.

Li Mingda has a similar personality as Empress Zhangsun. She was smart and  tactful. While Taizong was angry, she always comfort him.

Li Mingda died at the age 12. When she died, Taizong was extremely sad, due to the loss of his favorite daughter. Li Mingda was buried beside a temple.

References

633 births
644 deaths
Tang dynasty princesses
7th-century Chinese women
7th-century Chinese people
Emperor Taizong of Tang
Daughters of emperors
Royalty and nobility who died as children